Marin Magdić (born 13 April 1999) is a Croatian professional footballer who plays as a defender for Bosnian Premier League club Zrinjski Mostar.

References

External links
 

1999 births
Living people
Sportspeople from Osijek
Association football defenders
Croatian footballers
NK Sesvete players
NK Osijek players
HŠK Zrinjski Mostar players
First Football League (Croatia) players
Premier League of Bosnia and Herzegovina players
Croatian expatriate footballers
Expatriate footballers in Bosnia and Herzegovina
Croatian expatriate sportspeople in Bosnia and Herzegovina